The year 1891 in art involved some significant events.

Events
 May 10 – Danish sculptor Anne Marie Brodersen marries her compatriot, the classical composer Carl Nielsen, in St Mark's English Church, Florence, the couple having first met on March 2 in Paris. 
 June – Sidney Paget produces his first illustrations for Arthur Conan Doyle's Sherlock Holmes stories in The Strand Magazine.
 Henri Matisse begins his studies at the Académie Julian.
 Correspondence of Marie Bashkirtseff and Gustave Flaubert is published.
 Paul Gauguin sails to French Polynesia.
 Impressionist Armand Guillaumin wins 100,000 francs in the French state lottery and is able to devote himself to painting full-time.
 Félix Vallotton makes his first woodcuts.

Works

 William-Adolphe Bouguereau
 The Goose Girl
 Work Interrupted
 Frank Bramley – For Of Such Is The Kingdom Of Heaven
 Edward Burne-Jones – Sponsa de Libano
 Philip Hermogenes Calderon – St. Elizabeth of Hungary
 Milly Childers – Hugh Culling Eardley Childers
 Pierre Puvis de Chavannes – The Shepherd's Song
 Édouard Detaille – Vive L'Empereur: charge du quatrième hussards à la bataille de Friedland, 14 juin 1807
 Alexander Doyle – Statue of Henry W. Grady
 Thomas Eakins – Miss Amelia Van Buren (Phillips Collection, Washington, D.C.)
 James Ensor – Skeletons Fighting Over a Pickled Herring (Royal Museums of Fine Arts of Belgium, Brussels)
 Luke Fildes – The Doctor
 Akseli Gallen-Kallela – Aino Triptych (second version)
 Paul Gauguin – Tahitian Women on the Beach
 J. W. Godward
 Innocent Amusement
 A Pompeian Lady
 The Sweet Siesta of a Summer Day
 Hubert von Herkomer
 In the Black Country
 On Strike
 Carl Kahler – My Wife's Lovers
 Benjamin Williams Leader – The Excavation of the Manchester Ship Canal: Eastham Cutting with Mount Manisty in the Distance
 Sir Frederic Leighton – Perseus and Andromeda
 John Henry Lorimer – The Ordination of Elders in a Scottish Kirk
 Frederick William MacMonnies – Statue of James S. T. Stranahan
 Jan Matejko – Constitution of May 3, 1791
 Claude Monet
 The Haystack Series
 The Poplar Series
 Edvard Munch – Melancholy (first version)
 Mikhail Nesterov – The Vision of the Youth Bartholomew
 Henrietta Rae – Miss Nightingale at Scutari (1854)
 Ilya Repin – Reply of the Zaporozhian Cossacks
 Tom Roberts – A break away!
 Henri Rousseau – Tiger in a Tropical Storm
 Augustus Saint-Gaudens – Adams Memorial
 John Singer Sargent – Egyptians Raising Water from the Nile
 Giovanni Segantini
 Midday in the Alps
 The Punishment of Lust
 Georges Seurat – completion of The Circus (Musée d'Orsay, Paris)
 John "Hans" Staehli – Chiming Fountain, Portland, Oregon
 Henri de Toulouse-Lautrec – Moulin Rouge: La Goulue (color lithographic poster)
 Edward Arthur Walton – Bluette
 J. W. Waterhouse – Circe Offering the Cup to Ulysses
 George Frederic Watts – After the Deluge

Births
 January 21 – Franz Sedlacek, Austrian painter (died 1945)
 February 13 – Grant Wood, American painter (died 1942)
 April 2 – Max Ernst, German painter, sculptor, graphic artist and poet (died 1976)
 April 4 – Virgilio Guidi, Italian painter (died 1984)
 April 7 – David Low, New Zealand-born editorial cartoonist (died 1963)
 May 10 – Mahmoud Mokhtar, Egyptian sculptor (died 1934)
 June 8 – Audrey Munson, American actress and artist's model (died 1996)
 June 19 – John Heartfield, born Helmut Herzfeld, German graphic designer (died 1968)
 June 30 - Stanley Spencer, English painter (died 1959)
 August 15 – Iva Despić-Simonović, Croatian sculptor (died 1961)
 August 25 – Alberto Savinio, Italian writer, painter and composer (died 1952)
 September 22 – Alma Thomas, African American abstract expressionist painter (died 1978)
 October 7 – Charles R. Chickering, American illustrator (died 1970)
 October 11 – George Ault, American painter (died 1948)
 December 2 – Otto Dix, German painter and graphic artist (died 1969)
 December 9 – Mark Gertler, British painter (died 1939)

Deaths
 January 27 – Jervis McEntee, American painter of the Hudson River School (born 1828)
 January 30 – Charles Joshua Chaplin, French painter and engraver (born 1825)
 January 31 – Jean-Louis-Ernest Meissonier, French classicist painter (born 1815)
 February 9 – Johan Jongkind, Dutch painter (born 1819)
 March 19 – Ernest Hoschedé, French businessman and collector of Impressionist paintings (born 1837)
 March 26 – Herman Frederik Carel ten Kate, Dutch watercolorist (born 1822)
 March 29 – Georges Seurat, French Post-Impressionist painter (born 1859)
 April 5 – Daniel Cottier, Scottish-born artist and designer (born 1837)
 April 14 – Carlos Luis de Ribera y Fieve, Spanish painter, son of Juan Antonio Ribera (born 1815)
 May 12 – Louisa Beresford, Marchioness of Waterford, British Pre-Raphaelite watercolourist (born 1818)
 May 16 – John Banvard, American panorama painter (born 1815)
 September 5 – Jules-Élie Delaunay, French academic painter (born 1828)
 September 6 – Elise Arnberg, Swedish miniaturist and photographer (born 1826) 
 September 9 – William Theed, English sculptor (born 1804)
 September 11 – Théodule Ribot, French realist painter (born 1823)
 September 15 – John Steell, Scottish portrait sculptor (born 1804)
 October 30 – Truman Seymour, American soldier and painter (born 1824)

 
Years of the 19th century in art
1890s in art